Recophora beata is a moth of the family Noctuidae. The species was first described by Otto Staudinger in 1892. It is found from Anatolia and southern Turkey eastward to Iraq, south-western Iran, Syria and Israel.

Adults are on wing from May to June. There is one generation per year.

External links

species info

Cuculliinae
Moths of the Middle East
Moths described in 1892